The Center for Problem-Oriented Policing is an American nonprofit organization dedicated to studying and advancing problem-oriented policing. It consists of police practitioners, universities, and scholars studying policing. It was established in 1999 at the University of Albany, with funding from the Department of Justice's Office of Community Oriented Policing Services.

References

Non-profit organizations based in New York (state)
Organizations established in 1999
Law enforcement in the United States
1999 establishments in New York (state)